Rendall is a surname that may refer to:

Alexander Rendell (born 1990), Thai actor and singer
Athelstan Rendall (1871–1948), British politician
Athelstan Rendall (pilot) (1914–2006), British pilot
David Rendall (tenor) (born 1948), English opera singer
George Rendall (c. 1791–1837), British colonial governor in the Gambia
Gerald Rendall (1851–1945), English educator and college administrator
Isaac Norton Rendall (1825–1912), American minister and college administrator
John Ballard Rendall (1847–1924), American minister, educator, and politician 
Jonathan Rendall (1964–2013), British writer
Mark Rendall (born 1988), Canadian actor
Paul Rendall (born 1954), English rugby union player
Robert Rendall (1898–1967), Scottish poet and amateur naturalist
Tom Rendall (1933–2002), Canadian ice hockey player